Jean-Marie Charpentier (27 April 1939 – 24 December 2010) was a French architect and urban planner. He founded Arte Charpentier' in Paris in 1969.

Biography
Jean-Marie Charpentier was born in Paris, France.

Jean-Marie Charpentier graduated in urbanism at the University of Paris in 1966, and at the École nationale supérieure des beaux-arts in 1969. He taught architecture in Cambodia for a year, before founding Arte Charpentier'' in Paris in 1969. Arte stands for Architecture, Research, Technique and Environment. The agency comprises four practices: urban planning & design, landscape design, architecture, interior design.

In 1984, Jean-Marie Charpentier is one of the first European architects to settle in China.

Jean-Marie Charpentier is the grand-nephew of composer Gustave Charpentier.

Projects
 Shanghai Grand Theatre

External links
 Arte Charpentier's website

References

1939 births
2010 deaths
Architects from Paris
École des Beaux-Arts alumni
20th-century French architects
21st-century French architects
Chevaliers of the Légion d'honneur